Eupione, or eupion, is a hydrocarbon of the paraffin series, probably a pentane, C5H12, discovered by Carl Reichenbach in wood tar. It is also formed in the destructive distillation of many substances, as wood, coal, caoutchouc, bones, resin and the fixed oils. It is a colorless, highly volatile and flammable liquid, having at 20 °C a specific gravity of 0.65.

References

Hydrocarbons